Man Like Me is the debut studio album by American country music artist Bobby Pinson. It was released in 2005 by RCA Nashville and peaked at #23 on the Billboard Top Country Albums chart. The album includes the singles "Don't Ask Me How I Know" and "Way Down."

Track listing

Personnel
Bart Busch- background vocals
John Catchings- cello
Perry Coleman- background vocals
Eric Darken- percussion
Glen Duncan- fiddle
David Grissom- electric guitar
Mark Hill- bass guitar
Troy Lancaster- electric guitar
Blue Miller- background vocals
Russ Pahl- steel guitar, dobro
Billy Panda- acoustic guitar, mandocello, mandolin
Lucy Pinson- background vocals
Brian Pruitt- drums, percussion
Mike Rojas- keyboards
Russell Terrell- background vocals

Chart performance

References
[ Man Like Me] at Allmusic

2005 debut albums
Bobby Pinson albums
RCA Records albums